The Other Paper was an alternative weekly news publication that served the Greater Columbus, Ohio area from 1990 to 2013.

It was distributed on Thursdays and was known for local news and features such as concert and movie reviews, classified ads, and personals, all with a distinctly irreverent, humorous style. It had the second-largest newspaper distribution in Columbus behind The Columbus Dispatch.

The Other Paper, which since 1990 had been published by Columbus-based CM Media, was bought by Dallas-based American Community Newspapers in 2007, along with its sister publications Columbus Monthly, Columbus CEO and the 22 weekly newspapers printed by Suburban News Publications. American Community Newspapers sold its Columbus properties to Dispatch Printing Company in 2011.

On January 7, 2013, the Dispatch Co. announced it would shut down The Other Paper at the end of the month, citing duplication of Columbus Alive, the alternative weekly purchased by the Dispatch in 2006.  The last edition of The Other Paper was published January 31, 2013.

References

External links
The Other Paper website'

Newspapers published in Columbus, Ohio
Alternative weekly newspapers published in the United States
1990 establishments in Ohio
2013 disestablishments in Ohio
Publications established in 1990
Publications disestablished in 2013